Idool 2007 was the third season of the Belgian version of the Idol series. The show aired on VTM, and began on 20 February 2007. It was won on 25 May by Dean Delannoit.

About

Finals

Finalists
(ages stated at time of contest)

Finals Elimination Chart

Live Show Details

Heat 1 - Top 10 Girls (16 March 2007)

Heat 2 - Top 10 Boys (17 March 2007)

Heat 3 - Top 8 Girls (23 March 2007)

Heat 4 - Top 8 Boys (24 March 2007)

Live Show 1 (30 March 2007)
Theme: My Idol

Live Show 2 (6 April 2007)
Theme: The Beatles & The Rolling Stones

Live Show 3 (13 April 2007)
Theme: Dutch Songs

Live Show 4 (20 April 2007)
Theme: My Birth Year

Live Show 5 (27 April 2007)
Theme: French Songs

Live Show 6 (4 May 2007)
Theme: Big Band

Live Show 7 (11 May 2007)
Theme: Unplugged

Live Show 8: Semi-final (18 May 2007)
Theme: Rock Hits

Live final (25 May 2007)
Theme: Rock Hits

Idool (TV series)
2007 Belgian television seasons